El sueño de Calpurnia (Calpurnia's Dream, also called Calpurnia, the wife of Julius Caesar) is a 1861 painting by Luis Álvarez Catalá which depicts the nightmare Calpurnia had the night before the death of her husband Julius Caesar. The work won Álvarez a Gold Medal at the first National Exposition of Florence and a second place at the National Exhibition of Fine Arts of Spain in 1862.

References

Cultural depictions of Calpurnia (wife of Caesar)
1861 paintings